Between Riverside and Crazy is a 2014 play by playwright, screenwriter, director, and actor Stephen Adly Guirgis. The play won the 2015 Pulitzer Prize for Drama, the 2015 New York Drama Critics Circle Award for Best Play, the 2015 Lucille Lortel Award for Outstanding Play, the 2015 Outer Critics Circle Award for Outstanding New Off-Broadway Play and the 2015 Off Broadway Alliance Award for Best New Play.

Production history
The play opened Off-Broadway at the Atlantic Theater Company's Linda Gross Theater, with previews that began on July 10, 2014 and a premiere on July 31. Its initial run was extended from August 16 to 23. A Second Stage Theatre production ran from February 11, 2015 through March 22, 2015 at the company's Tony Kiser Theatre with previews beginning January 16.

The play was directed by Austin Pendleton, with a cast that featured Stephen McKinley Henderson as "Walter 'Pops' Washington", Victor Almanzar (Oswaldo), Rosal Colon (Lulu), Liza Colón-Zayas (Church Lady), and Ron Cephas Jones (Junior) (Ray Anthony Thomas as Junior in the 2014 production). Michael Rispoli played the chief antagonist (Lt. Caro) and Elizabeth Canavan played the ambivalent role of Pops' old partner (Detective O'Connor) 

The play was produced at the American Conservatory Theater, Geary Theater in San Francisco in September 2015. Directed by Irene Lewis, the cast featured Carl Lumbly as Pops, Catherine Castellanos as the Church Lady, Samuel Ray Gates as Junior, Elia Monte-Brown as Lulu, and Lakin Valdez as Oswaldo.

Studio Theatre in Washington, DC staged the play from January 13, 2016 to February 28, 2016.

Artists Repertory Theatre, located in Portland, Oregon, staged Between Riverside and Crazy from March 4 to April 1, 2018.

Speakeasy Stage Company, located in Boston, Massachusetts, staged Between Riverside and Crazy from September 7 to October 6, 2018 starring Tyrees Allen (Pops), Alejandro Simoes (Oswaldo), Stewart Evan Smith (Junior), Octavia Chavez-Richmond (Lulu), Celeste Oliva (Church Lady), Maureen Keiller (Det. O'Connor), and Lewis D. Wheeler (Lt. Caro).

American Stage Company, located in Saint Petersburg, FL, staged Between Riverside and Crazy from October 3 - November 4, 2018.

The play made its Broadway debut at the Hayes Theater in previews on November 30, 2022 and officially opened on December 19. The production is directed by Austin Pendleton and features much of the original off-Broadway cast.

Plot
Walter "Pops" Washington is a retired New York City policeman. His wife has died and his son, "Junior", has just been released from jail. They live in a rent-controlled apartment on Riverside Drive in New York City. Junior's girlfriend, Lulu, and Oswaldo, a recovering addict, also spend time at the apartment. Walter has been pursuing a discrimination suit against the Police Department, because he was accidentally shot by another police officer.

Critical response
Jesse Green, in his review for New York Magazine, wrote: "Stephen Adly Guirgis... chooses the right kind of worlds to write about: parallel to, but in many ways hidden from, our own, strange enough to fascinate yet recognizable enough to hit home....The play is completely compelling even before its primary dramatic gears start turning..."

Marilyn Stasio, in her review for Variety wrote: "You have to wonder what those out-of-towners will make of 'Between Riverside and Crazy', the scribe’s latest love/hate song to this impossible town and its outlandish citizenry. Some might be baffled by the rancorous real-estate battles between landlords and tenants of Gotham’s rent-controlled apartments.  But everyone’s bound to be captivated by Guirgis’s loudmouthed locals and the terrific ensemble players... If anyone can handle the scribe’s idiom — a warm, rich dialect that comes right off the city streets — these are the guys."

The TheaterMania reviewer commented on the set: "Pendleton helps us to see how the pieces fit together, with scenes often bleeding from one to the next. Walt Spangler's mammoth rotating set... helps to create these moments. He's had to condense the set for the smaller uptown stage, eliminating a half-bath and moving the furniture in tighter. This creates an overstuffed feeling appropriate for an Upper West Side apartment continuously occupied for several decades. A late scene in which the set continues to rotate as the actors move from room to room has a cinematic agility that is rarely achieved onstage."

Awards and nominations
The play won the 2015 Pulitzer Prize for Drama. The committee wrote of the play that it is "a nuanced, beautifully written play about a retired police officer faced with eviction that uses dark comedy to confront questions of life and death." The play won the 2015 New York Drama Critics Circle Award for Best Play.

The play was nominated for the 2015 Drama League Award, Outstanding Production of a Play. It was nominated for the 2015 Drama Desk Award in the categories of Outstanding Play, Outstanding Actor in a Play (Stephen McKinley Henderson) and Outstanding Director of a Play (Austin Pendleton).

The play was nominated for six 2015 Lucille Lortel Awards: Outstanding Play (winner), Outstanding Director (Austin Pendleton), Outstanding Lead Actor in a Play (Stephen McKinley Henderson) (winner),  Outstanding Featured Actress in a Play (Liza Colón-Zayas) (winner), Outstanding Featured Actor in a Play (Victor Almanzar), Outstanding Scenic Design (Walt Spangler).

The play was nominated for two 2015 Outer Critics Circle Awards: Outstanding New Off-Broadway Play, and Outstanding Actor in a Play (Stephen McKinley Henderson) and won for Outstanding New Off-Broadway Play.

Stephen McKinley Henderson received a 2015 Obie Award for Performance for his role as Pop.

The play received two 2015 Off Broadway Alliance Awards: Best New Play, and a Legend of Off Broadway Honoree Award for director Austin Pendleton.

References

External links
Between Riverside and Crazy at IOBDb.com

2014 plays
Pulitzer Prize for Drama-winning works
Plays by Stephen Adly Guirgis
Plays set in New York City